Henry Vincent (10 May 1813 – 29 December 1878) was active in the formation of early Working Men's Associations in Britain, a popular Chartist leader, brilliant and gifted public orator, prospective but ultimately unsuccessful Victorian member of parliament, and later an anti-slavery campaigner.

Early life 

Vincent was born in High Holborn, the son of a goldsmith. He saw his father's business fail, a decline in circumstances that prompted the family to move to Kingston upon Hull.

By 1828 Vincent was a young apprentice boy in the growing printing trade. Once his apprenticeship was completed he returned to London to pursue his printing career. At this time he was very interested in the views of Tom Paine and especially Paine's views on universal suffrage (including votes for women) and state welfare benefits.

Political awakening 

By 1833 Vincent was in London working as a printer but also deepening his political awareness and knowledge. In 1836 he joined the recently formed London Working Men's Association and he was quickly recognised as one of the best young orators promoting universal suffrage and workers rights.

In 1837 he accompanied John Cleave on a summer speaking tour in the industrial north of England and they helped local activists to establish Working Men's Associations in Hull, Leeds, Bradford, Halifax and Huddersfield.

Responsibility and resistance

In 1838 Vincent was given responsibility for promoting universal suffrage and welfare benefits and Working Men's Associations in industrial South Wales and the West Country of England from Cornwall up to Wiltshire and Gloucestershire.

During this time the message of votes for all, improvement of working conditions, shorter work days (Early Closing Movement), adequate wages and the right to meet to improve conditions for all was meeting stiff resistance from the Establishment, gentry, employers and industrialists.  During a visit to Devizes, Vincent was knocked unconscious when he was beaten up.

Oratorial virtuosity and appearance 

Vincent was an accomplished public orator, passionate but logical and a clear, concise speaker with energy and drive.  He was able to convince men and women from all walks of life to agree with his message. It was said of him that he was

RC Gammage in his account of "The History of The Chartist Movement" in 1859:

Target of the authorities 

The authorities sought to obstruct Vincent and deny him the opportunity to speak out. They feared a worker's revolution with resulting violence and damage to property, and they were particularly opposed to those Chartists who were advocating the use of physical force to achieve their aims and vent their resentment and fury.

Government spies followed Vincent, seeking evidence to arrest and convict him at a time when transportation to Australia or death by hanging were some of the punishments for stirring up social unrest.

Gaol 

In May 1839 Vincent was arrested and imprisoned at Monmouth County Gaol for making inflammatory remarks. He was eventually tried at Shire Hall, Monmouth on 2 August 1839 and sentenced to one year imprisonment.

Whilst in prison, he was denied writing materials and only permitted religious books as reading material.

It was in part at least the arrest of this prominent and popular chartist leader that gave rise to the Newport Rising in South Wales 1839.

Release, rearrest and gaol again 

Upon release, Vincent found himself under close scrutiny again.  He was re-arrested almost immediately for "using seditious language".

In court, he conducted his own defence, but was found guilty and sentenced to another year imprisonment.

This time, he was permitted visits from, amongst others, Francis Place, who was allowed to teach Vincent French, political economy and history.

Release, marriage and a new publication 
Upon his release from prison in January 1841 Vincent made plans to marry Lucy, the daughter of John Cleave, editor of the Working Man's Friend. The newly married couple took up residence in Bath, amongst close friends and supporters and began the publication of The National Vindicator.

Modified stance and message 
Vincent was immediately back on the road, making up for lost time and promulgating the Chartist message throughout the country.  This time he was shrewd enough to take a stance with the "moral force" chartists under William Lovett rather than the "physical force chartists" and spoke using less inflammatory language, focusing on improving education and the moral improvement of the working classes. He now joined groups linked with the more readily popular temperance movement and helped form teetotal political societies. Many of the leading industrialists, or their wives, were in favour of teetotalism and temperance, and condemned the social evils of drink.

However, there was a price to pay for this moderate stance. Previously close allies within the Chartist movement such as Feargus O'Connor now fell out with Vincent, disagreeing over the watering down of the physical force message and the distraction of the non-central temperance message.

In 1842 Vincent contributed to the setting up of the Complete Suffrage Union. Although still a member of the National Charter Association, Vincent was no longer the envied spirited orator and firm ally of the inner circle of the most prominent and influential Chartists.  Some of his old friendships and bonds were now broken.

Attempted political career 
The National Vindicator ceased publication in 1842 and Vincent focused more on lectures, on wider subjects than Chartism. He gave a lecture on the Great Exhibition at the Concert-room in Wisbech in 1851. He stood for election as an Independent Radical in Ipswich (1842 and 1847), Tavistock (1843), Kilmarnock (1844), Plymouth (1846), and finally York (1848 and 1852). He was unsuccessful each time.

Later career 
Despite these setbacks, Vincent continued to hold and develop his views and was invited to speak on long tours of America in 1866, 1867 and again in 1875 and 1876. Anti-slavery was his focus at this stage. He also spoke by invitation on progressive political subjects, such as "Oliver Cromwell" in Rochester, New York on 2 December 1869.

His wider travels stimulated his interest in world politics and working conditions. In 1876 he was active in opposing atrocities that had taken place in Bulgaria.

Death and legacy 
Vincent died on 29 December 1878 and is buried at Abney Park Cemetery in Stoke Newington.

References

External links 
 The full text of Henry Vincent's account of his Life and Rambles, February to May 1839, on A Vision of Britain through Time, with links to the places mentioned.
 History Zone; Chartist Lives – Henry Vincent

Chartists
English abolitionists
Burials at Abney Park Cemetery
People from Holborn
1813 births
1878 deaths